The 145th Street station is a bi-level express station on the IND Eighth Avenue and Concourse lines of the New York City Subway, located at the intersection of 145th Street and St. Nicholas Avenue in Harlem and Hamilton Heights, Manhattan. It is served by the A and D trains at all times, by the C train at all times except late nights, and by the B train on weekdays only.

History

Planning and opening 

On August 3, 1923, the New York City Board of Estimate approved the Washington Heights Line, an extension of the Broadway Line to Washington Heights. The line was to have four tracks from Central Park West at 64th Street under Central Park West, Eighth Avenue, Saint Nicholas Avenue, and private property to 173rd Street, and two tracks under Fort Washington Avenue to 193rd Street. South of 64th Street, one two-track line would connect to the Broadway Line stubs at 57th Street, and another would continue under Eighth Avenue to 30th Street at Penn Station, with provisions to continue downtown.

Mayor John Hylan instead wanted to build an independent subway system, operated by the city. The New York City Board of Transportation (NYCBOT) gave preliminary approval to several lines in Manhattan, including one on Eighth Avenue, on December 9, 1924. The main portion of the already-approved Washington Heights Line—the mostly-four track line north of 64th Street—was included, but was to continue north from 193rd Street to 207th Street. South of 64th Street, the plan called for four tracks in Eighth Avenue, Greenwich Avenue, the planned extension of Sixth Avenue, and Church Street. Two tracks would turn east under Fulton Street or Wall Street and under the East River to Downtown Brooklyn.

A groundbreaking ceremony was held at St. Nicholas Avenue and 123rd Street on March 14, 1925. Most of the Eighth Avenue Line was dug using a cheap cut-and-cover method, where the street above was excavated. Still, the construction of the line was difficult, as it had to go under or over several subway lines.

The station opened on September 10, 1932, as part of the city-operated Independent Subway System (IND)'s initial segment, the Eighth Avenue Line between Chambers Street and 207th Street. At this time, only the upper level of the station opened, as the IND Concourse Line was still under construction. When the IND Concourse Line opened for service on July 1, 1933, the lower level was opened.

Later years 
The station has been undergoing renovations since 2017 as part of the 2010–2014 MTA Capital Program. This is because of an MTA study conducted in 2015, which found that 45 percent of components were out of date.

Station layout

The upper level has four tracks and two island platforms. The station used to have a full mezzanine, now, the central portion is used as a police precinct. The lower level has three tracks and two island platforms. The northbound platform here is twice as wide as the station's other three similarly sized platforms, being 39 feet wide, so that the three trackways on the lower level line up directly with those above. Escalators lead up from this level to the mezzanine, bypassing the upper-level platforms.

The center track on the lower level is used to terminate B trains during middays and early evenings, when it does not run into the Bronx. During rush hours, this track is used by D trains that run express on the IND Concourse Line in the peak direction. This track is not used during late nights or weekends.

On the upper level, just north of the station, there is an open space next to the uptown local track that was a remnant of the construction of the subway and not built for a specific purpose. That open space is where the lower level tracks turn off to the IND Concourse Line. There is a hole in the floor that allows a view of the lower level.

Both levels have a trim line on the track walls, which is yellow with a black border. It's set in a two-high course, a pattern usually reserved for local stations. Tile captions reading "145" in while lettering on black run below the trim line at regular intervals. Yellow I-beam columns run along all the platforms, alternating ones having the standard black station name plate with white lettering.

South of this station, through 135th Street, to just north of 125th Street, the line has six tracks. The express trains use the innermost pair of tracks, and the locals uses the outermost tracks. This section of the line is nicknamed “Homeball Alley” due to the large amount of switches and signals in this area.

Exits
The full-time entrance is at 145th Street with a part-time north exit at 147th Street. The station has entrances leading to each corner of St. Nicholas Avenue and West 145th Street, an entrance between buildings on the west side of St. Nicholas Avenue between West 147th and West 148th Streets, and an entrance on the east side of St. Nicholas Avenue between West 147th and West 148th Streets. There is a closed exit to the northwestern corner of St. Nicholas Avenue and West 146th Street.

References

External links 

 
 Station Reporter — A Lefferts
 Station Reporter — A Rockaway
 Station Reporter — B Train
 Station Reporter — C Train
 Station Reporter — D Train
 The Subway Nut — 145th Street Pictures 
 145th Street modern entrance from Google Maps Street View
 147th Street entrance from Google Maps Street View
 Upper platforms from Google Maps Street View
 Lower platforms from Google Maps Street View

1932 establishments in New York City
Hamilton Heights, Manhattan
IND Concourse Line stations
IND Eighth Avenue Line stations
New York City Subway stations in Manhattan
New York City Subway terminals
New York City Subway transfer stations
Railway stations in the United States opened in 1932